Telangana is a state in India situated on the south-central stretch of the Indian peninsula on the high Deccan Plateau. On 2 June 2014, the area was separated from the northwestern part of Andhra Pradesh as the newly formed state of Telangana, with Hyderabad as its capital. Its other major cities include Warangal, Nizamabad, Khammam, Karimnagar and Ramagundam. Telangana is bordered by the states of Maharashtra to the north, Chhattisgarh to the northeast, Karnataka to the west, and Andhra Pradesh to the east and south. As of 2019, the state of Telangana is divided into 33 districts.

Throughout antiquity and the Middle Ages, the region now known as Telangana was ruled by multiple major Indian powers such as the Mauryans, Satavahanas, Vishnukundinas, Chalukyas, Cholas, Rashtrakutas, Kakatiyas, Delhi Sultanate, Bahmani Sultanate, Golconda Sultanate. During the 16th and 17th centuries, the region was ruled by the Mughals of India. The region is known for its Ganga-Jamuni tehzeeb culture. During the 18th century and the British Raj, Telangana was ruled by the Nizam of Hyderabad. In 1823, the Nizams lost control over Northern Circars (Coastal Andhra) and Ceded Districts (Rayalseema), which were handed over to the East India Company. The annexation by the British of the Northern Circars deprived Hyderabad State, the Nizam's dominion, of the considerable coastline it formerly had, to that of a landlocked princely state with territories in the central Deccan, bounded on all sides by British India. Thereafter, the Northern Circars were governed as part of Madras Presidency until India's independence in 1947, after which the presidency became India's Madras state.

The Hyderabad state joined the Union of India in 1948 after a police action. In 1956, the Hyderabad State was dissolved as part of the linguistic reorganization of states and Telangana was merged with the Telugu-speaking Andhra State (part of the Madras Presidency during the British Raj) to form Andhra Pradesh. A peasant-driven movement began to advocate for separation from Andhra Pradesh starting in the early 1950s, and continued until Telangana was granted statehood on 2 June 2014 under the leadership of K. Chandrashekar Rao.

Telangana ranks 22nd among Indian states in human development index. The state has emerged as a major focus for robust IT software, industry and services sector. The state is also the main administrative Centre of many Indian defence aerospace and research labs like Bharat Dynamics Limited, Defence Metallurgical Research Laboratory, Defense Research and Development Organization and Defence Research and Development Laboratory.

Hyderabadi cuisine and Kakatiya architecture both from Telangana, are on the list of creativity UNESCO creative city of gastronomy and UNESCO World Heritage Site. The cultural centers of Telangana, Hyderabad and Warangal, are noted for their wealth and renowned historical structures – Ramappa Temple (UNESCO World Heritage Site), Charminar, Qutb Shahi Tombs, Falaknuma Palace, Chowmahalla Palace, Warangal Fort, Kakatiya Kala Thoranam, Thousand Pillar Temple and the Bhongir Fort in Yadadri Bhuvanagiri district. The historic city Golconda in Hyderabad established itself as a diamond trading Centre and, until the end of the 19th century, the Golconda market was the primary source of the finest and largest diamonds in the world. Thus, the legendary name Golconda Diamonds became synonymous with Golconda itself. Religious edifices like the Lakshmi Narasimha Temple in Yadadri Bhuvanagiri district, Makkah Masjid in Hyderabad, the ancient Bhadrakali Temple and Govinda Rajula Gutta in Warangal, Alampur Jogulamba Temple in Jogulamba Gadwal district and Medak Cathedral, Kondagattu Anjaneya Swamy Temple, Kondagattu Veerabhadra Swamy Temple, Lord Shiva temple in Vemula Wada of Rajanna-Sircilla district are several of its most famous places of worship. Buddhism also flourished in the region and many Aramams can be found.

Etymology 
A popular etymology derives the word "Telangana" from Trilinga desha ("land of three lingas"), a region so-called because three important Shaivite shrines were located here: Kaleshwaram (in present day Telangana), Srisailam and Draksharama (in present day Andhra Pradesh). According to Jayadhir Thirumala Rao, a former director of Andhra Pradesh Oriental Manuscripts Library and Research Centre, the name Telangana is of Gondi origin. Rao asserts that it is derived from "Telangadh", which according to him, means "south" in Gondi and has been referred to in "Gond script dating back to about 2000 years".

One of the earliest uses of a word similar to Telangana can also be seen in a name of Malik Maqbul (14th century CE), who was called the Tilangani, which implies that he was from Telangana. He was the commander of the Warangal Fort (Kataka Pāludu).

A 16th-century travel writer, Firishta, recorded in his book:
During the just reign of Ibrahim Kootb Shah, Tulingana, like Egypt, became the mart of the whole world. Merchants from Toorkistan, Arabia, and Persia resorted to it; and they met with such encouragement that they found in it inducements to return frequently. The greatest luxuries from foreign parts daily abounded at the king's hospitable board.

The word "Telinga" changed over time to "Telangana" and the name "Telangana" was designated to distinguish the predominantly Telugu-speaking region of the erstwhile Hyderabad State from its predominantly Marathi-speaking one, Marathwada. After Asaf Jahis ceded the Seemandhra region to the British, the rest of the Telugu region retained the name Telangana and the other parts were called Madras Presidency's Circars and Ceded.

History 

Telangana was governed by many rulers, including the:

 Maurya Empire (320 BCE–180 BCE)
 Satavahana dynasty (180 BCE–220 CE)
 Vakataka dynasty (250 CE–500 CE) 
 Vishnukundina dynasty (420 CE–624 CE)
 Chalukya dynasty (543 CE–753 CE) 
 Rashtrakuta dynasty (753 CE–982 CE)
 Kakatiya dynasty (1083 CE–1323 CE)
 Delhi Sultanate (1323 CE–1326 CE)
 Musunuri Nayaks (1326 CE–1356 CE)
 Recherla Nayaks (1356 CE–1424 CE)
 Bahmani Sultanate (1347 CE–1512 CE)
 Vijayanagara Empire (1336 CE–1646 CE)
 Qutb Shahi dynasty (1512 CE–1687 CE)
 Mughal Empire (1687 CE–1724 CE)
 Asaf Jahi Dynasty (1724 CE–1948 CE)

Early history 
The Satavahana dynasty (230 BCE–220 CE) became the dominant power in this region. It originated from the lands between the Godavari and Krishna rivers and was based at Amaravathi and Dharanikota. After the decline of the Satavahanas, various dynasties, such as the Vakataka, Vishnukundina, Chalukya, Rashtrakuta and Western Chalukya, ruled the area.

Kakatiya Dynasty 

The Telangana area experienced its golden age during the reign of the Kakatiya dynasty, which ruled most parts of the present-day Andhra Pradesh and Telangana from 1083 to 1323 CE. Rudrama Devi and Prataparudra II were prominent rulers from the Kakatiya dynasty. The dynasty weakened with the attack of Malik Kafur in 1309 and was dissolved after the defeat of Prataparudra by the forces of Muhammad bin Tughluq in 1323.

Qutab Shahi and Asaf Jahi's 

The area came under the rule of the Delhi Sultanate in the 14th century, followed by the Bahmani Sultanate. Quli Qutb Mulk, a governor of Golconda, revolted against the Bahmani Sultanate and established the Qutb Shahi dynasty in 1518. On 21 September 1687, the Golconda Sultanate came under the rule of the Mughal emperor Aurangzeb after a year-long siege of the Golconda fort.

During the early seventeenth century a strong cotton-weaving industry existed in Telangana. Large quantities of cotton were produced for domestic and exports consumption. High quality plain and patterned cloth made of muslin and calico was produced.

In 1712, Qamar-ud-din Khan was appointed by emperor Farrukhsiyar as the viceroy of Deccan with the title Nizam-ul-Mulk (meaning "Administrator of the Realm"). He was later recalled to Delhi, with Mubariz Khan appointed as the viceroy. In 1724, Qamar-ud-din Khan defeated Mubariz Khan to reclaim the Deccan suba, establishing it as an autonomous province of the Mughal empire. He took the name Asif Jah, starting what came to be known as the Asaf Jahi dynasty. He named the area Hyderabad Deccan. Subsequent rulers retained the title Nizam ul-Mulk and were called Asif Jahi Nizams or nizams of Hyderabad. The Medak and Warangal divisions of Telangana were part of their realm.

When Asif Jah I died in 1748, there was political unrest due to contention for the throne among his sons, who were aided by opportunistic neighbouring states and colonial foreign forces. In 1769, Hyderabad city became the formal capital of the Nizams. The Nizam Nasir-ud-dawlah, Asaf Jah IV signed the subsidiary alliance with the British in 1799 and lost its control over the state's defence and foreign affairs. Hyderabad State became a princely state among the presidencies and provinces of British India.

In 1787, heavy flooding killed over 20,000 causing a plague which killed about 10,656,000 Telugus again in Telangana.

Post-independence 
When India became independent from the British Empire in 1947, the Nizam of Hyderabad did not want to merge with the Indian Union and wanted to remain independent. The Government of India annexed Hyderabad State on 17 September 1948 after a military operation called Operation Polo. It appointed a civil servant, M. K. Vellodi, as first chief minister of Hyderabad State on 26 January 1950. He administered the state with the help of English-educated bureaucrats from the Madras and Bombay states, who were familiar with British systems of administration unlike the bureaucrats of Hyderabad State who used a completely different administrative system. The official language of the state was switched from Urdu to English.

In 1952, Dr. Burgula Ramakrishna Rao was elected chief minister of the Hyderabad State in its first democratic election. During this time, there were violent agitations by some Telanganites to send the Madras state bureaucrats back and implement a rule by the natives (mulkis) of Hyderabad (Syed Alam Sharjil) was elected chief minister of Hyderabad after (Dr. Burgula Ramakrishana Rao) for one year after he resigned from the post.

Telangana Rebellion 

The Telangana Rebellion was a peasant revolt supported by the communists. It originated in the Telangana regions of the Hyderabad State between 1946 and 1951, led by the Communist Party of India (CPI).

The revolt began in the Nalgonda district against the feudal lords of Reddy and Velama castes. It quickly spread to the Warangal and Bidar districts. Peasant farmers and labourers revolted against the local feudal landlords (jagirdars and deshmukhs) and later against the Nizam Osman Ali Khan. The violent phase of the movement ended after the government of India's Operation Polo. Starting in 1951, the CPI shifted to a more moderate strategy of seeking to bring communism to India within the framework of Indian democracy.

States Reorganisation Commission 
In December 1953, the States Reorganisation Commission (SRC) was appointed to form states on a linguistic basis. An agreement was reached between Telangana leaders and Andhra leaders on 20 February 1956 to merge Telangana and Andhra with promises to safeguard Telangana's interests. After reorganisation in 1956, the region of Telangana was merged with Andhra State to form Andhra Pradesh.

Following this Gentlemen's agreement, the central government established the unified state of Andhra Pradesh on 1 November 1956. G.O 553 of 1959 from the united Andhra Pradesh state moved two revenue divisions of Bhadrachalam from East Godavari and Aswaraopeta from West Godavari to Khammam for administrative convenience.

Telangana movement 

There have been several movements to revoke the merger of Telangana and Andhra, major ones occurring in 1969, 1972, and 2009. The movement for a new state of Telangana gained momentum in the 21st century by an initiative of Kalvakuntla Chandrashekhar Rao from Telangana Rashtra Samithi later joined by Telangana Political Joint Action Committee, TJAC including political leadership representing the Telangana area. On 9 December 2009 the government of India announced the process of formation of the Telangana state. Violent protests led by people in the Coastal Andhra and Rayalseema regions occurred immediately after the announcement, and the decision was put on hold on 23 December 2009.

The movement continued in Hyderabad and other districts of Telangana. There have been hundreds of claimed suicides, strikes, protests and disturbances to public life demanding separate statehood.

Formation of Telangana state in 2014 

On 30 July 2013, the Congress Working Committee unanimously passed a resolution to recommend the formation of a separate Telangana state. After various stages the bill was placed in the Parliament of India in February 2014. In February 2014, Andhra Pradesh Reorganisation Act, 2014 bill was passed by the Parliament of India for the formation of Telangana state, comprising ten districts from north-western Andhra Pradesh. The bill received the assent of the president and was published in the Gazette on 1 March 2014.

The state of Telangana was officially formed on 2 June 2014. Kalvakuntla Chandrashekar Rao was elected as the first chief minister of Telangana, following elections in which the Telangana Rashtra Samithi party secured majority. Hyderabad will remain as the joint capital of both Telangana and Andhra Pradesh for a period, not more than ten years after that period Hyderabad shall be the capital of the state of Telangana and there shall be a new capital for the state of Andhra Pradesh. Andhra Pradesh picked Amaravati as its capital and relocated its secretariat in 2016 and its legislature in 2017.

Geography 

Telangana is situated on the Deccan Plateau, in the central stretch of the eastern seaboard of the Indian Peninsula. The region is drained by two major rivers, with about 79% of the Godavari River catchment area and about 69% of the Krishna River catchment area, but most of the land is arid. Telangana is also drained by several minor rivers such as the Bhima, the Maner, the Manjira, the Musi, and the Tungabhadra

The annual rainfall is between 900 and 1500 mm in northern Telangana and 700 to 900 mm in southern Telangana, from the southwest monsoons. Telangana contains various soil types, some of which are red sandy loams (Chalaka), Red loamy sands (Dubba), lateritic soils, salt-affected soils, alluvial soils, shallow to medium black soils and very deep black cotton soils. These soil types allow the planting of a variety of fruits and vegetable crops such as mangoes, oranges, coconut, sugarcane, paddy, banana and flower crops.

Climate 
Telangana is a semi-arid area and has a predominantly hot and dry climate. Summers start in March, and peak in May with average high temperatures in the  range. The monsoon arrives in June and lasts until September with about 755 mm (29.7 inches) of precipitation. A dry, mild winter starts in late November and lasts until early February with little humidity and average temperatures in the  range.

Ecology 
The Central Deccan Plateau dry deciduous forests ecoregion covers much of the state, including Hyderabad. The characteristic vegetation is woodlands of Hardwickia binata and Albizia amara. Over 80% of the original forest cover has been cleared for agriculture, timber harvesting, or cattle grazing, but large blocks of forest can be found in Nagarjunsagar-Srisailam Tiger Reserve and elsewhere. The more humid Eastern Highlands moist deciduous forests cover the Eastern Ghats in the eastern part of the state.

National parks and sanctuaries 
Telangana has three National Parks: Kasu Brahmananda Reddy National Park in Hyderabad district, and Mahavir Harina Vanasthali National Park and Mrugavani National Park in Ranga Reddy district.

Wildlife Sanctuaries in Telangana include Eturunagaram Wildlife Sanctuary and Pakhal Wildlife Sanctuary in Warangal District, Kawal Tiger Reserve and Pranahita Wildlife Sanctuary in Adilabad district, Kinnerasani Wildlife Sanctuary in Khammam district, Manjira Wildlife Sanctuary in Medak district, Nagarjunsagar-Srisailam Tiger Reserve in Nalgonda and Mahbubnagar districts, Pocharam Wildlife Sanctuary in Medak and Nizamabad districts, Shivaram Wildlife Sanctuary in Karimnagar district.

Sacred groves are small areas of forest preserved by local people. Sacred groves provide sanctuary to the local flora and fauna. Some are included within other protected areas, like Kadalivanam in Nagarjunsagar–Srisailam Tiger Reserve, but most stand alone. There are 65 sacred groves in Telangana—two in Adilabad district, thirteen in Hyderabad district, four in Karimnagar district, four in Khammam district, nine in Mahbubnagar district, four in Medak district, nine in Nalgonda district, ten in Ranga Reddy district, and three in Warangal district.

Demographics

Language 

Telugu one of the classical languages of India is the official language of Telangana and Urdu is the second official language of the state. About 75% of the population of Telangana speak Telugu and 12% speak Urdu. Before 1948, Urdu was the official language of Hyderabad State, and due to a lack of Telugu-language educational institutions, Urdu was the language of the educated elite of Telangana. After 1948, once Hyderabad State joined the new Republic of India, Telugu became the language of government, and as Telugu was introduced as the medium of instruction in schools and colleges, the use of Urdu among non-Hyderabadi Muslims decreased. Both Telugu and Urdu are used in services across the state, such as the Telangana Legislature website, with Telugu and Urdu versions of the website available, as well as the Hyderabad metro, wherein both languages are used on station names and signs along with English and Hindi. The Urdu spoken in Telangana is called Hyderabadi Urdu, which in itself is a dialect of the larger Dakhini Urdu dialects of South India. Although the language is spoken by most Hyderabadi Muslims, the language in a literary context has long been lost, and standard Urdu is used. Hindi is spoken mainly in Hyderabad, as well as some other urban areas like Warangal. Lambadi, a language related to Rajasthani dialects, is spoken throughout the state. Marathi is predominant in regions bordering Maharashtra, especially in the old Adilabad district, while Kannada is spoken by significant minorities along some parts of the Karnataka border. The old Adilabad district has a large number of speakers of tribal languages such as Gondi and Kolami, while Koya is a language spoken by significant numbers in Bhadradi Kothagudem district and along the Chhattisgarh border.

Religion 

According to the 2011 census, Hindus form 85.1% of the State's population. Muslims form 12.7% and Christians form 1.3%.

Literacy 
According to the 2011 census, Telangana's literacy rate is 66.46%. Male literacy and female literacy are 74.95% and 57.92%, respectively. Hyderabad district has the highest literacy rate with 80.96% and Mahabubnagar district has the lowest with 56.06%.

In a 2019 report, the Key Indicators of Household Social Consumption on Education in India, by the Ministry of Statistics and Programme Implementation, Telangana has a literacy rate of 72.8% which is the fourth lowest of large states. It also has the second lowest literacy rate among rural women at 53.7%. 37.1% of the population aged 3–35 years received free education at pre-primary and higher levels in Telangana.

Administrative divisions 

The state is divided into 33 districts. The latest two new districts, Mulugu and Narayanpet, were formed on 17 February 2019. The districts are divided into 70 revenue divisions which are further divided into 584 mandals.

The districts in the state are:

There are a total of 12 cities in the state. Hyderabad is the biggest city in the state and 4th largest city in India. There are 13 municipal corporations and 132 municipalities in the state.

Government and politics 

Telangana is governed by a parliamentary system of representative democracy, a feature the state shares with other Indian states. Universal suffrage is granted to residents. There are three branches of government.

 Executive authority is vested in the Council of Ministers headed by the Chief Minister, although the titular head of government is the Governor. The governor is the head of state appointed by the President of India. The leader of the party or coalition with a majority in the Legislative Assembly is appointed as the chief minister by the governor, and the Council of Ministers are appointed by the governor on the advice of the chief minister. The Council of Ministers reports to the Legislative Assembly.
 The legislature, the Telangana Legislative Assembly and the Telangana Legislative Council, consists of elected members and special office bearers such as the Speaker and Deputy Speaker, that are elected by the members. Assembly meetings are presided over by the speaker or the deputy speaker in the speaker's absence. The Assembly is bicameral with 119 Members of the Legislative Assembly and 40 Member of the Legislative Council. Terms of office run for five years unless the Assembly is dissolved prior to the completion of the term. The Legislative Council is a permanent body with one-third of members retiring every two years.
 The judiciary is composed of the High Court of Judicature at Hyderabad and a system of lower courts.

Auxiliary authorities known as panchayats, for which local body elections are regularly held, govern local affairs. The state contributes seats to Lok Sabha.

The main players in the regional politics are the Telangana Rashtra Samithi, All India Forward Bloc, All India Majlis-e-Ittehadul Muslimeen, Bharatiya Janata Party and Indian National Congress. Following the Telangana Legislative Assembly Election in 2014, the Telangana Rashtra Samithi under Kalvakuntla Chandrashekar Rao was elected to power.

Economy 

The economy of Telangana is mainly driven by agriculture. Two important rivers of
India, the Godavari and Krishna, flow through the state,
providing irrigation. Farmers in Telangana mainly depend on rain-fed water sources for irrigation. Rice is the major food crop. Other important crops are cotton, sugar cane, mango, and tobacco. Recently, crops used for vegetable oil production such as sunflower and peanuts have gained favour. There are many multi-state irrigation projects in development, including Godavari River Basin Irrigation Projects and Nagarjuna Sagar Dam, the world's highest masonry dam.

The state has also started to focus on the fields of information technology and biotechnology. Telangana is one of top IT-exporting states of India. There are 68 Special Economic Zones in the state.

Telangana is a mineral-rich state, with coal reserves at Singareni Collieries Company. The Golconda region has produced some of the world's most famous diamonds, including the colourless Koh-i-Noor (United Kingdom), the blue Hope (United States), the pink Daria-i-Noor (Iran), the white Regent (France), the Dresden Green (Germany), and the colourless Orlov (Russia), Nizam and Jacob (India), as well as the now-lost diamonds Florentine Yellow, Akbar Shah and Great Mogul.

Agriculture 

Rice is the major food crop and staple food of the state. Other important crops are maize, tobacco, mango, cotton and sugar cane. Agriculture has been the chief source of income for the state's economy. The Godavari and Krishna rivers flow through the state, providing irrigation. Apart from major rivers, there are small rivers like Tunga Bhadra, Bima, Dindi, Kinnerasani, Manjeera, Manair, Penganga, Pranahitha, peddavagu and Taliperu. There are many multi-state irrigation projects in development, including Godavari River Basin Irrigation Projects and Nagarjuna Sagar Dam, the world's highest masonry dam.

Agri Export Zones for the following produce have been proposed for the following locations:
 Gherkins: Mahabubnagar, Rangareddy, Medak, Karimnagar, Warangal
 Mangoes and grapes: Hyderabad, Rangareddy, Medak, Mahabubnagar

Neoliberal influences in cotton farming 
Andrew Flachs, an environmental anthropologist from Purdue University, wrote an article on his fieldwork in India. The article, In Planting and performing: Anxiety, aspiration, and “scripts” in Telangana cotton farming, was a way to help better understand the aspects of cotton farming, which remains a big market in India. Fachs's research demonstrates how the facets of cotton farming in India are a big example of “a growing neoliberal instability in rural India’s agrarian political economy.” For starters, Flachs recognizes that so much societal and financial pressure is put onto small cotton farmers. Because of this, cotton farmers in Telangana are at risk for “suicide and indebtedness”. According to Flachs, what drives most, if not all cotton farmers is what he refers to as “manci digubadi,” which translates to “I’m hoping for a good yield.” This saying is what the farmers refer to as a “script”. A “script” can be defined as a means for farmers to justify their decisions when it comes to seed planting and farming. Flachs claims that “scripts reveal how farmers are conditioned to follow rules and norms”. One major issue in Indian cotton farming is the lack of seed knowledge the farmers retain. Flachs affirms that each season is driven by the GM seed market. The privatization of this market has caused an influx of seeds and an immoral market. Each year the cotton farmers are purchasing the newest seeds with no previous knowledge or reference to empirical data. Because the cotton farms are considered in determining the validity of the farmer, farmers tend to just purchase seeds that their neighbors have had previous success with, despite existing confounding variables such as irrigation, weather, and pesticide use. While many of the cotton farmers have adapted to the constantly changing seed market in hopes to achieve a “good yield”, others have in turn abandoned agriculture altogether, or have even committed suicide to protest against the “Indian agribusiness”. Overall, Flachs asserts that “Manci digubadi” goes much deeper than achieving good yields, saying that this “script” is the result of cotton farmers seeking “social recognition, personal satisfaction, relief, and affirmation”.

Industries 

Several major manufacturing and services industries are in operation mainly around Hyderabad. Automobiles and auto components, spices, mines and minerals, textiles and apparels, pharmaceutical, horticulture, and poultry farming are the main industries in Telangana.

In terms of services, Hyderabad is nicknamed "Cyberabad" due to the location of major software industries in the city. Prior to secession, it contributed 10% to India's and 98% to Andhra Pradesh's exports in the IT and ITES sectors in 2013 With Hyderabad in the front line of Telangana's goal to promote information technology in India, the city boasts the HITEC City as its premier hub. IT companies have also been set up in Warangal and Khammam.

The state government is in the process of developing industrial parks at different places, for specific groups of industries. The existing parks are Software Park at Hyderabad, HITEC City for software units, Apparel Park at Gundlapochampalli, Export Promotion Park at Pashamylaram, Biotechnology park at Turkapally.

Hyderabad is also a major site for healthcare-related industries including hospitals and pharmaceutical organisations such as Nizam's Institute of Medical Sciences, Yashoda Hospitals, LV Prasad Eye Care, Akruti Institute of cosmetic and plastic surgery, Fever Hospital, Durgabai Deshmukh, Continental Hospitals and Apollo Hospitals. Many pharmaceutical and pharmaceutical-related companies like Dr. Reddy's Laboratories, Shantha Biotechnics and Aragen (Formerly GVK BIO) are based out of Hyderabad.

In addition, Hyderabad-based healthcare non-profits include the Indian Heart Association, a cardiovascular disease NGO.

Tourism 

Telangana State Tourism Development Corporation (TSTDC) is a state government agency which promotes tourism in Telangana. Telangana has a variety of tourist attractions including historical places, monuments, forts, waterfalls, forests and temples.

Waterfalls 

Kuntala Waterfall located in Kuntala, Adilabad district.
Bogatha Waterfall is waterfall located in Koyaveerapuram G, Wazeedu Mandal, Jayashankar Bhupalpally district, Telangana.
Savatula Gundam Waterfalls in Adilabad district

Awards 
Telangana state has won CNBC-TV18's Promising State of the Year Award for the year of 2015. The Jury for the India Business Leader Awards (IBLA) has collectively chosen Telangana for the award. The AIPH in the 2022 World Green City Awards awarded Telangana the World Green City Award 2022

Media 
The print media mainly consists of Telugu and English newspapers. Nava Telangana, Sakshi, Andhra Jyothi, Eenadu and Namaste Telangana are all Telugu newspapers. Mainly in English newspapers are Deccan Chronicle, The Times Of India, The Hindu, and The Hans India. Notable Urdu newspapers include Etemaad Daily, The Munsif Daily, and The Siasat Daily.

Infrastructure

Power 

Hydel and thermal power projects in the state meet the power requirements of the state. A number of new power projects are coming up in the State which is expected to generate additional power capacity in the state.

Irrigation projects

Major cities 
Adilabad
Hanamkonda
Hyderabad
Jagtial
Karimnagar
Khammam
Mahbubnagar
Mancherial
Miryalaguda
Nalgonda
Nizamabad
Ramagundam
Suryapet
Warangal
Siddipet

Major towns 

Armoor
Asifabad
Bellampalle
Bhadrachalam
Bhainsa
Bhongir
Bodhan
Gadwal
Huzurnagar
Huzurabad
Jammikunta
Jangaon
Kamalapur
Kamareddy
Kodad
Koratla
Kothagudem
Madhira
Mahabubabad
Medak
Metpally
Nagarkurnool
Nakrekal
Narayankhed
Naspur
Nirmal
Palwancha
Peddapalli
Siddipet
Sangareddy
Sathupalli
Sircilla
Tandur
Vikarabad
Wanaparthy
Zaheerabad

Transport 

The state is well connected with other states by means of road, rail and airways. The Telangana State Road Transport Corporation (TSRTC) is the major public transport corporation that connects all the cities and villages. Mahatma Gandhi Bus Station (M.G.B.S) in Hyderabad is one of the largest bus stand in Asia. Jubilee Bus Station in Secunderabad serves inter city bus services.

Roadways 

Railways 

The history of railways in this region dates back to the time of Nizam of Hyderabad in 1874. The Nizam's Guaranteed State Railway, which had its beginnings in a line built privately by the HEH the Nizam. Much to the dismay of the British authorities, The Nizam bore all the expenses for the construction of the line.

It operates under the auspices of the South Central Railway founded in 1966. The landmark building Rail Nilayam in Secunderabad is the Zonal Headquarters office of South Central Railway. Secunderabad and Hyderabad are the main divisions of the South Central Railway that fall in the state.

Airports 

Rajiv Gandhi International Airport at Shamshabad is an international airport serving the city of Hyderabad. It is the largest airport in the state and one of the busiest airports in the country. The government has plans to upgrade Warangal Airport, Nizamabad Airport and Ramagundam Airport. It also plans to construct airports in Ramagundam and Kothagudem.

Warangal has a domestic airport in Mamunooru which was established in the year 1930 during the Nizam period. All the exports and imports of Azam Jahi Mills, Warangal were done through the Warangal Airport.

Culture 

The State has a rich tradition in classical music, painting and folk arts such as Burra Katha, shadow puppet show, and Perini Shivatandavam, Gusadi Dance, Kolatam and Bathukamma.

The important festivals of the State are Bonalu and Bathukamma.

Architecture 
Badami Chalukya architecture is spread across the state, notable temple is Alampur Jogulamba Temple.

Chalukyas of Vemulavada built many Temples in Vemulawada, Bheemeshvara temple, Raja Rajeswara Temple, Vemulawada. 
Medieval forts such as the Bhongir Fort, Khammam Fort, and Rachakonda Fort are spread across the state. Among the notable ones is the Warangal Fort, which served as the capital of the Kakatiya dynasty. The Kakatiya Kala Thoranam within the fort has become a symbol of Telangana, and features on the state emblem. Ramappa Temple is a UNESCO World Heritage Site. The fort complex, and Thousand Pillar Temple are on the tentative list of the UNESCO World Heritage Sites.

Samsthanams built Temples in Dravidian architecture, Kollapur, and Jataprole Samsthanams, Gadwal Samsthanam built temples in Dravidian architecture. 

The Qutb Shahi dynasty established the city of Hyderabad as their capital. The Charminar, Golconda Fort, and Qutb Shahi tombs in Hyderabad were built by the Qutb Shahi dynasty.

The Nizam era saw the construction of palaces such as the Chowmahalla Palace and Falaknuma Palace, as well as elaborate public buildings such as the Osmania General Hospital, all in Hyderabad.

Religious destinations 

There are religious worship centres of different religions in the state.

Hindu worship destinations include Bhadrachalam Temple, Gnana Saraswati Temple, Yadagirigutta Temple, Ramappa Temple, Vemulawada Raja Rajeshwara temple, the Thousand Pillar Temple, Statue of Equality (Ramanuja).

The Muslim worship destinations such as Makkah Masjid near Charminar, Khairtabad Mosque, Koh-e-qaim, Mian Mishk Masjid, Toli Masjid and Spanish Mosque.

Christian worship centres include the Diocese of Dornakal of the Church of South India, Bahe Church of South India, and Medak Cathedral. There are also some Buddhist destinations, such as Nelakondapalli, Dhulikatta, Phanigiri and Kolanpaka.

Cinema 

Telugu cinema, also known by its sobriquet as Tollywood, is a part of Indian cinema producing films in the Telugu language, and is centred in the Hyderabad, Telangana neighbourhood of Film Nagar. In the early 1990s, the Telugu film industry had largely shifted from Chennai to Hyderabad. The Telugu film industry is the second-largest film industry in India next to Bollywood. In the years 2005, 2006 and 2008 the Telugu film industry produced the largest number of films in India, exceeding the number of films produced in Bollywood. The industry holds the Guinness World Record for the largest film production facility in the world.

Cuisine

Visual arts 
Indigenous art forms of Telangana include the Cheriyal scroll painting, Nirmal paintings, and Karimnagar Silver Filigree. A distinctive Persianate style of painting, called Deccan painting developed in the region during the medieval period.

Notable museums in the state include the Salar Jung Museum in Hyderabad, which is one of the largest in India. Other museums include the Telangana State Archeology Museum, City Museum, and Nizam Museum in Hyderabad, Warangal Museum in Warangal, and Alampur Museum in Alampur.

Education 

Telangana has multiple institutes of higher education universities along with numerous primary and secondary schools. The Department of Higher Education deals with matters relating to education at various levels in the state of Telangana.

According to a 2019 report, the state has a literacy rate of 72.8%, which is one of the lowest in India. Schools in Telangana are run by the state government or private organisations, which include religious institutions. Some specialized schools such as the Kendriya Vidyalayas and Jawahar Navodaya Vidyalayas are run by agencies of the central government. , there are 41,337 schools in the state, with about 70% of them being government schools.

Telangana is home to 27 universities, which include 3 central universities, 17 state universities, 2 deemed universities, and 5 private universities. The Osmania University in Hyderabad, established in 1918, is the oldest modern university in the state, and one of the largest university systems in the world. The University of Hyderabad consistently ranks among the top universities in the country. Apart from these, specialised institutes of national importance in the state include AIIMS Bibinagar, IIT Hyderabad, and NIT Warangal.

Other notable institutions include Indian School of Business, Jawaharlal Nehru Technological University, Hyderabad, Kakatiya University, International Institute of Information Technology, Hyderabad, NALSAR University of Law, Kaloji Narayana Rao University of Health Sciences, National Institute of Fashion Technology Hyderabad, Footwear Design and Development Institute, National Institute of Pharmaceutical Education and Research, Hyderabad, and Rajiv Gandhi University of Knowledge Technologies, Basar, among others.

Sports 

The Hyderabad FC is a professional football club based in Hyderabad and plays in top-tier league of India, the Indian Super League. The home ground of the club is G.M.C Balayogi Athletic Stadium, in Gachibowli.

The Hyderabad cricket team is represented in the Ranji Trophy and has won twice. The Sunrisers Hyderabad, an Indian Premier League franchise, is based in Hyderabad and has won the trophy once. Deccan Chargers, a currently defunct franchise from Hyderabad, also won the Indian Premier League once. The Rajiv Gandhi International Cricket Stadium is the home ground of both Hyderabad cricket team and Sunrisers Hyderabad. It hosts international as well as domestic matches. The Hyderabad Hunters, a Premier Badminton League franchise; the Telugu Titans, a Pro Kabaddi League franchise; the Hyderabad Sky, a UBA Pro Basketball League franchise and the Telugu Tigers, a Premier Futsal franchise are also based in Hyderabad. Hyderabad Hunters are previous winners of the Premier Badminton League title.

Other stadiums include G. M. C. Balayogi Athletic Stadium, Lal Bahadur Shastri Stadium and Gachibowli Indoor Stadium.

Notable people

See also 
 Ganga-Jamuni tehzeeb
 Hyderabad State
 Hyderabad State (1948–1956)
 List of people from Telangana
 Telangana Language Day
 List of Cities and Towns in Telangana

References

Further reading 

  (Direct link.)

External links 

Government
 Official Site of Telangana Government

General information
  
   
 
  
 

 
.
States and territories established in 2014
2014 establishments in India
States and union territories of India